Rated Korina (formerly known as Rated K) is a Philippine television newscast lifestyle and Magazine show produced by Brightlight Productions and associated by ABS-CBN, hosted by Korina Sanchez. It currently broadcast via Cignal TV's One PH and TV5 and via ABS-CBN's Kapamilya Channel, ZOE Broadcasting Network's A2Z, Kapamilya Online Live, worldwide via The Filipino Channel and on streaming platform iWantTFC. This is the first time in a year that Rated Korina will air again on ABS-CBN's permanently replacement channel Kapamilya Channel and its other platforms.

The program originally premiered as Rated K on May 16, 2004, on ABS-CBN as a supposedly interim replacement for Sharon but was extended due to its high ratings. In 2020, the program was retitled as Rated Korina and transferred to TV5 under Brightlight Productions. After a year, the program will also be screened on ABS-CBN's Philippine TV platforms Kapamilya Channel, Kapamilya Online Live and A2Z, internationally via The Filipino Channel, and on streaming platform iWantTFC. Brightlight Productions other shows like Sunday 'Kada is also broadcast on iWantTFC (Pilot episode) and worldwide via The Filipino Channel (Every Sunday), other shows are rumored to premiere on ABS-CBN's platforms but as of now, no announcement has been made except Rated Korina, Sunday 'Kada, and I Got You.

Background
The program was aired every Sunday nights on ABS-CBN's Yes Weekend! block. It aired a replay telecast on DZMM TeleRadyo every Monday at 2:00PM and Tuesday at 1:00AM, and on Jeepney TV every Wednesday at 4:30PM, It also aired worldwide via TFC. The program is similar in style and presentation with the defunct news magazine show Balitang K which was also hosted by Sanchez herself.

On August 11, 2019, Rated K moved to its new timeslot at 6:15PM after Goin' Bulilit ended to give way for the Kapamilya Super Blockbusters movie block.

The show was temporarily suspended on May 3, 2020, due to the temporary closure of ABS-CBN because of the cease and desist order of the National Telecommunications Commission (NTC), following the expiration of the network's 25-year franchise granted in 1995.

Rated K was effectively cancelled by ABS-CBN, having been excluded from the programming lineup of Kapamilya Channel and replaced by Iba 'Yan, hosted by Angel Locsin. Sanchez and its staff continued the program as an online show utilizing their social media accounts.

The show moved to TV5 and was retitled as Rated Korina, after Sanchez signed a contract with Brightlight Productions on October 7, 2020. The second incarnation of Rated K premiered on the network's Saturday afternoon block on October 24, 2020.

The show went on series break on April 24, 2021. On May 29, 2021, the show returned to its original international TV platform, TFC.

Since June 19 and 20, 2021, the show returned on air for a new season. Aside on its airing via One PH every Sunday nights at 7pm and on TV5 every Saturday at 5pm (since August 6, 2022, to give way for Oh My Korona) later moved to earlier timeslot replacing Top Class, it also premiered on ABS-CBN's blocktime channel with ZOE's A2Z and ABS-CBN's Kapamilya Channel every Saturday at 5pm, respectively. It also premiered on ABS-CBN's Kapamilya Online Live, replacing re-runs of Gandang Gabi, Vice!, and We Rise Together and on its OTT platform iWantTFC, and worldwide via The Filipino Channel. This is the first time in a year that Rated Korina will air on ABS-CBN platforms.

Main host
 Korina Sanchez

Radio program
A radio show entitled Rated Korina was aired on DZMM and cable channel DZMM TeleRadyo from 2012 to 2014. The radio program ended on January 3, 2014, and was replaced by Sakto, initially hosted by Marc Logan (now replaced by Kim Atienza in 2018, then Jeff Canoy and Johnson Manabat in 2020) and Amy Perez. Sanchez resigned from her radio program to pursue her master's degree at Ateneo de Manila University.

See also
List of programs broadcast by ABS-CBN
List of programs broadcast by TV5 (Philippine TV network)
List of programs broadcast by Radyo5/One PH
List of programs broadcast by Kapamilya Channel
List of programs broadcast by A2Z (Philippine TV channel)
List of programs broadcast by Kapamilya Online Live

References

External links
 
 
 
 
 

ABS-CBN original programming
ABS-CBN News and Current Affairs shows
TV5 (Philippine TV network) original programming
2004 Philippine television series debuts
Philippine documentary television series
Philippine television docudramas
Filipino-language television shows
Television series by Brightlight Productions